Filicium is a genus of flowering plants in the soapberry family Sapindaceae, native to east Africa, Madagascar, India and Sri Lanka. The best known species is Filicium decipiens, which is planted as an ornamental tree.

Species
Species currently accepted by The Plant List are as follows: 
Filicium decipiens (Wight & Arn.) Thwaites
Filicium longifolium (H.Perrier) Capuron
Filicium thouarsianum (DC.) Capuron

References

 
Sapindaceae genera
Taxa named by Joseph Dalton Hooker
Taxa named by George Bentham